The Wildcat (Spanish: El gato montés) is a 1936 Spanish musical drama directed by Catalan Rosario Pi and starring Pablo Hertogs, María del Pilar Lebrón, Víctor Merás and Mapy Cortés. It is based on the 1916 Spanish popular opera (also known as zarzuela or Spanish operetta) El gato montés by Manuel Penella. El gato montés is the first film in Spanish sound cinema directed by a woman.

Cast

References

Bibliography 
 Bentley, Bernard. A Companion to Spanish Cinema. Boydell & Brewer, 2008.
Martin-Márquez, Susan. Feminist Discourse and Spanish Cinema: Sight Unseen. Oxford UP, 1999.

External links 
 

1930s musical drama films
1936 films
1930s Spanish-language films
Films based on operas
Spanish black-and-white films
Spanish musical drama films
1936 drama films